Doğancılar can refer to the following villages in Turkey:

 Doğancılar, Akçakoca
 Doğancılar, Alaplı
 Doğancılar, Çan
 Doğancılar, Dursunbey
 Doğancılar, Gölpazarı